Lucien Dautresme (21 May 1826 – 18 February 1892) was a French politician of the French Third Republic. He was minister of commerce (9 November 1885 – 6 January 1886) in the government of Henri Brisson and minister of commerce and industry (30 May 1887 – 2 April 1888) in the government of Maurice Rouvier and Pierre Tirard. He was a member of the Chamber of Deputies of France from 1876 to 1891 and the Senate of France from 1891 until his death.

References

Bibliography
 
 
 « Lucien Dautresme », dans le Dictionnaire des parlementaires français (1889-1940), sous la direction de Jean Jolly, PUF, 1960.

External links
 Fiche biographique sur le site de l'Assemblée nationale
 Fiche biographique sur le site du Sénat

1826 births
1892 deaths
French Ministers of Commerce
People of the French Third Republic
French Senators of the Third Republic
Senators of Seine-Maritime